Zhu Agen, also known as Zhu Zhiyuan (born 1904, date of death unknown) was a member of the 28 Bolsheviks. In October 1927, he left Shanghai for the Soviet Union and enrolled in Moscow Sun Yat-sen University. In June 1930, he was made leader of the Shanghai Workers' Association. On 17 January 1931, Zhu was made later of the Jiangsu Party Organization by the Jiangnan Provincial Committee. He served two terms, from January to June 1931 and from June to November 1933. From February to June 1931, while simultaneously serving his first term as Jiangsu Provincial leader, he served as leader of the Shanghai Party Committee. Zhu later left the Communist Party of China sometime after 23 November 1933.

Notes
"匪軍離贛西竄期間，一九三五年四月，軍行抵貴州盤縣，留部隊一連，在北盤江一帶進行游擊戰爭，派朱阿根任游擊隊長，羅明任政治指導員，旋被國軍殲滅，羅明被俘，由羅卓英將軍以同鄉同宗關係保釋自新（按﹕共匪竊據大陸後，羅明曾出任匪廣東省政協委員并執教於中山大學）。"

References

 民主革命时期中共上海地方组织历任正副书记、委员、候补委员表 https://web.archive.org/web/20131219045315/http://www.shtong.gov.cn/node2/node2245/node4523/node28550/node28552/node60654/userobject1ai13392.html
1927～1928年主要留苏学生情况表 https://web.archive.org/web/20131219044520/http://www.shtong.gov.cn/node2/node2245/node66268/node66284/node66345/node66426/userobject1ai62445.html
孙耀文 风雨五载——莫斯科中山大学始末 中央编译出版社
《中共上海党史大典》 中共上海市委党史研究室编纂 第274页

Moscow Sun Yat-sen University alumni
Chinese Communist Party politicians
1904 births
Year of death missing